The Santa Cruz Surfing Museum is a museum which was established in May 1986 to document the history of surfing.  With collections dating back to the earliest years of surfing on mainland United States, the museum houses a historical account of surfing in Santa Cruz, California.

Location
Located in the Mark Abbott Memorial Lighthouse at Lighthouse Point on West Cliff Drive, the Santa Cruz Surfing Museum opened its doors in June 1986 as the first surfing museum in the world.
The lighthouse was built in 1967 as a memorial to surfer Mark Abott, who died while surfing at the nearby Pleasure Point surf break.

Overlooking the Steamer Lane surfing hotspot, this little museum features photographs, surfboards, and videos tracing over 100 years of surfing history in Santa Cruz.
After funding cuts in 2009, the Santa Cruz Surfing Club Preservation Society and private donations kept the museum open.

Exhibits

The exhibits at the museum explore over 100 years of surfing in Santa Cruz. Introduced in 1885 by three Hawaiian princes who surfed the mouth of the San Lorenzo River on plank boards, surfing has permeated every facet of the Santa Cruz community.
A plaque was dedicated to the princes: David Kawānanakoa, Edward Abnel Keliʻiahonui, and Jonah Kūhiō Kalanianaʻole (later a delegate to US Congress) in April 2010.

Throughout its history, surf culture has reflected and responded to popular culture. Photographs chronicle the evolution of surfing culture in Santa Cruz from idyllic summers spent at the beach in the 1930s and 1940s, through the hipster beach party 1950s, the surf rock 1960s, the “soul surfing” 1970s, the neon 1980s, and the rebirth of classic long-board riding in the 1990s.

Examples of surfboards from each era are on display, from the huge hollow paddle boards and redwood planks made and ridden in the 1930s and 1940s to examples of early foam and fiberglass boards, and speedy short boards used to create radical new surf moves beginning in the 1970s.

Santa Cruz Light
The museum contains the current Santa Cruz Light, marking Point Santa Cruz on the west side of Santa Cruz Anchorage.

The original lighthouse was one of a number of California coastal lights allocated funding by Congress in 1850, only 19 days after statehood. Because of disputes over ownership of the land, construction did not proceed until 1868. The original light was a two-story wooden structure, with a lantern housing a fifth-order fresnel lens. Erosion of Point Santa Cruz required the lighthouse to be moved back  in 1879.

Around 1909  (sources vary, possibly 1913) the lens was replaced with a fourth-order fresnel, for better visibility against the light of the city. The light was electrified in 1917, replaced by a wooden tower in 1941, and the original building demolished in 1948.

See also

 List of lighthouses in the United States

References

External links

 Santa Cruz Surfing Museum Website
 Santa Cruz Surfing Museum City of Santa Cruz website
 Location of the museum and its surrounding

Museums in Santa Cruz County, California
Sports museums in California
Santa Cruz, California
Surfing museums
Surfing in California
Museums established in 1986
1986 establishments in California
Sports in Santa Cruz County, California